Zena Cole is an American Paralympic discus thrower, who has competed at the 2012 London and 2016 Rio de Janeiro Games, winning a bronze medal in London.

Biography
Zena Cole was born in Ohio. When she was 18-months-old she contracted polio and spent years in an iron lung ventilator. Until the age of twelve, she used crutches and braces which often broke while she was playing outside. The doctors suggested that she should use a wheelchair. In 1991 she was diagnosed with a condition called post-polio syndrome which caused her to retire from the Ohio Bureau of Vocational Rehabilitation.

In 2011, Cole won a silver medal at the 2011 IPC Athletics World Championships and the same year won a gold medal at the Parapan American Games. She also participated at the 2012 Summer Paralympics where she won a bronze medal for discus throw of 5.29 m. She participated in the 2013 IPC Athletics World Championships in Lyon, France, competing in discus and club throw.

At the 2016 Rio de Janeiro Paralympics, she beat her previous personal best of 4.89 m with a 4.98 m throw at the Women's Discus Throw in the F52 category but came sixth.

References

External links

Living people
Date of birth missing (living people)
Paralympic track and field athletes of the United States
Paralympic bronze medalists for the United States
Medalists at the 2012 Summer Paralympics
Athletes (track and field) at the 2012 Summer Paralympics
Athletes (track and field) at the 2016 Summer Paralympics
American female discus throwers
Track and field athletes with disabilities
Sportspeople from Ohio
Year of birth missing (living people)
Paralympic medalists in athletics (track and field)
21st-century American women